

The Brochet MB.110 was a four-seat light aircraft developed in France in the early 1950s.

Design and development
A further derivative of the Brochet MB.70 family, generally similar to those aircraft, the MB.110 was a substantially new and enlarged design. Apart from a bigger passenger cabin with one more seat than previous models, the wing and tail were redesigned, and a more powerful engine was fitted.  Two examples were built. The prototype aircraft first flew at Chavenay-Villepreux airfield near Paris on 12 March 1956.

Specifications

References

 
 
 

1950s French sport aircraft
Brochet aircraft
High-wing aircraft
Single-engined tractor aircraft
Aircraft first flown in 1956